Budgie were a Welsh heavy metal band from Cardiff. The band formed in 1967, and the following year recorded a demo; in 1971, their first album (of blues-oriented hard rock), produced by Rodger Bain, was released by MCA. The band, a classic power trio with the occasional keyboard player, released ten albums, with MCA, A&M, and RCS, between 1971 and 1982, attracting a fair number of fans and achieving modest commercial success. 

Budgie were one of the earliest heavy metal bands, and according to Garry Sharpe-Young they were a seminal influence to many acts of that scene, particularly the so-called new wave of British heavy metal, and later acts such as Metallica. The band has been noted as "among the heaviest metal of its day."

History
Budgie formed in 1967 in Cardiff, Wales under the name Hills Contemporary Grass. Their original line-up consisted of Burke Shelley on vocals and bass, Tony Bourge on guitar and vocals, and Ray Phillips on drums. After performing several gigs in 1968, the band changed their name to Budgie the following year and recorded their first demo. The band had initially considered going under the name "Six Ton Budgie", but decided the shorter single word variant was preferable. Burke Shelley has said that the band's name came from the fact that he, "loved the idea of playing noisy, heavy rock, but calling ourselves after something diametrically opposed to that".

Their debut album of strong, blues-oriented hard rock was recorded at Rockfield Studios with Black Sabbath producer Rodger Bain and released in 1971, followed by Squawk in 1972. The third album, Never Turn Your Back on a Friend (1973), contained  "Breadfan", which was covered by Metallica in 1987. Metallica had covered another Budgie song, "Crash Course in Brain Surgery", earlier in their career. Ray Phillips left the band before the fourth album In for the Kill! was recorded. He was replaced by Pete Boot.

In late 1974, Boot left and was replaced by Steve Williams for the album Bandolier. For concerts promoting this album (and the follow-up, If I Were Brittania I'd Waive the Rules), the band were augmented by second guitarist Myf Isaac. Music from the 1978 LP Impeckable was featured in the 1979 film J-Men Forever (shown frequently on the USA Network's "Night Flight" T.V. in the 1980s) which is now considered a cult classic. Both Bourge and Isaac left in 1978 and were replaced by ex Trapeze guitarist Robert Kendrick and ex Hawkwind guitarist Huw Lloyd-Langton. Langton's stint was short lived as Kendrick convinced the band to fire him.  In late 1978, having been dropped by A&M and with no new recording contract, this line up floundered, and after 12 months Kendrick was replaced by "Big" John Thomas (b. 21 February 1952) in late 1979. This line up recorded two albums for Kingsley Ward's 'Active' label: Power Supply (1980) and Nightflight (1981). 1982 saw them signed to RCA for Deliver Us from Evil their final recording for a major label.

The band continued to have success during the new wave of British heavy metal period, playing the Reading Festival in 1980 and then headlining the festival in 1982. They built a particular following in Poland, where they played as the first heavy metal band behind the Iron Curtain, in 1982. Also notable was their tour in support of Ozzy Osbourne's Blizzard of Ozz Tour.

The band stopped gigging in 1987. Members went into studio production, occasionally guesting on other projects; Thomas most notably worked on the Phenomena CD with Glenn Hughes out of the Black Sabbath studios.

Although the group had little commercial success in America, they have enjoyed a strong cult following in Texas, and they have been known to receive radio airplay from Joe Anthony and Lou Roney on KMAC/KISS radio in San Antonio in the 1970s, as well as KSHE95 in St. Louis. The band reformed using various drummers for one-off gigs in 1995, 1996 for outdoor festivals 'La Semana Alegre' in San Antonio, Texas. They toured in 2002–6, mostly in the United Kingdom, the NYC/NJ area, Dallas, and with a few shows in Europe including the Sweden Rock Festival and a return to Poland. In 1999 the band officially reformed in Letchworth.

In 2006, Budgie undertook a 35 date UK tour and released a new album, You're All Living in Cuckooland on 7 November that year. In 2007 they also played in Sweden and Poland.

On 4 July 2007, Lees announced his departure from the band to concentrate on teaching and a solo career. Following the departure of Lees, Dio lead guitarist and songwriter Craig Goldy offered his services while Ronnie James Dio was completing commitments with Heaven & Hell. In February 2008, Craig Goldy accompanied Budgie on their first tour of Australia, and continued playing with the band as 'guest guitarist' for all their shows.

Budgie's November 2010 tour of Eastern Europe had to be cancelled as Shelley was hospitalised on 9 November in Wejherowo, Poland with a 6 cm aortic aneurysm. After surgery, he returned to Britain for recovery.

On 3 March 2016, former guitarist John Thomas died at the age of 63 after being admitted to the hospital with pneumonia. The news of his death was confirmed by drummer Steve Williams on Facebook: "My friend and fellow BUDGIE band member John Thomas sadly passed away last night. My thoughts are with the loved ones he left behind."

In February 2018, former Budgie drummer Pete Boot died at the age of 67. For many years he had been coping with Parkinson's disease.

In April 2018, founder member and original drummer Ray Phillips released his autobiography.

After more than a decade of health issues, including an aortic aneurysm and Stickler syndrome, Shelley died on 10 January 2022, at the age of 71.

Musical style and legacy
Budgie is best known as a hard rock and heavy metal band which incorporated elements of progressive rock and humor into their musical style. Beginning with 1975's Bandolier, Budgie also began to incorporate funk into their music.

Budgie's music was described in the All-Music Guide as a cross between Rush and Black Sabbath. Burke Shelley's vocals have been compared to Geddy Lee due to his similar approach of high-pitched banshee wails (coincidentally, Shelley and Lee are also the bass players in their respective power-trio bands). Although Budgie remained quite obscure during their early career, many future stars of hard rock/metal have cited them as an important influence and covered their songs, including Iron Maiden, Metallica, Megadeth, Van Halen, Melvins, Queens of the Stone Age, Alice in Chains, and Soundgarden.

Metallica released a cover of "Breadfan" in September 1988 as a B-side to their "Harvester of Sorrow" single. It was later included on their 1998 album Garage Inc., and was also used as an encore during their 1988–1989 tour supporting their ...And Justice for All album. A live video version is present on the Live Shit: Binge & Purge boxed set, taken from their Seattle concerts on 29 and 30 August 1989 where it was performed in the second encore. It was also played with frequency during the Madly in Anger with the World Tour and World Magnetic Tour. A short clip of "Breadfan" is played at the beginning of the "Whiskey in the Jar" music video. They also covered "Crash Course in Brain Surgery" on the Garage Days Re-Revisited EP.

Members

Final lineup
Burke Shelley – lead vocals, bass 
Steve Williams – drums, percussion, backing vocals 
Craig Goldy – guitar

Discography

Studio albums

Live albums

Compilation albums

EPs
If Swallowed, Do Not Induce Vomiting (1980, Active BUDGE 1)

Singles (UK-exclusive unless stated otherwise)
"Crash Course in Brain Surgery" / "Nude Disintegrating Parachutist Woman" (1971, MCA MK 5072)
"Whiskey River" / "Guts" (1972, MCA MK 5085)
"Whiskey River" / "Stranded" (1972, MCA 2185) – US-exclusive release
"Zoom Club (Edit)" / "Wondering What Everyone Knows" (1974, MCA 133)
"I Ain't No Mountain" / "Honey" (1975, MCA 175)
"Smile Boy Smile" / "All at Sea" (1978, A&M AMS 7342)
"Crime Against the World" / "Hellbender" (1980, Active BUDGE 2)
"Keeping a Rendezvous" / "Apparatus" (1981, RCA BUDGE 3) – UK No. 71
"I Turned to Stone (Part 1)" / "I Turned to Stone (Part 2)" (1981, RCA BUDGE 4)
"I Turned to Stone" / "She Used Me Up" (1981, Tonpress S-445) – Polish release
"Bored with Russia" / "Don't Cry" (1982, RCA 271)

Notes

References
The New Musical Express Book of Rock, 1975, Star Books,

External links
 Official website
 Budgie biography from BBC Wales
 
 

1967 establishments in Wales
2010 disestablishments in Wales
Welsh heavy metal musical groups
Welsh hard rock musical groups
Musical groups established in 1967
Musical groups disestablished in 1988
Musical groups reestablished in 1995
Musical groups disestablished in 1996
Musical groups reestablished in 1999
Musical groups disestablished in 2010
British musical trios
Musical groups from Cardiff
Kapp Records artists
MCA Records artists